Q'ara Willk'i (Aymara q'ara bald, bare, willk'i gap, "bald gap", also spelled Khara Willkhi) is a mountain in the Andes of Bolivia which reaches a height of approximately . It is located in the La Paz Department, Aroma Province, Colquencha Municipality.

Q'ara Willk'i is also the name of a stream which originates at the mountain. It flows to the Q'arawi Jawira (Carahui Jahuira) in the east.

References 

Mountains of La Paz Department (Bolivia)